MISC. is the third studio album by the Japanese visual kei band DIMLIM, released on January 28, 2020 by DUM LABEL. The album was planned to be released in December 2019 but has been postponed to January 28.

Overview 
The album distanced itself from the band's original sound, which was previously influenced by deathcore and metalcore, now fit into the genres of math rock and alternative rock. In an interview with JaME World, Sho said that the name of the album "comes from the essence of several places", thus giving the name miscellany. Regarding the musical genre of the album, Retsu said "we think DIMLIM is its own musical genre [...]" and Sho said that "there have been big changes in the way we see the music [...]".

Tour 
DIMLIM announced their first overseas tour in 2020, promoting the album's release. It has dates in Mexico, Brazil, Chile and Russia. The concert in Mexico was canceled due to low demand but afterwards was reconfirmed by another company.

The concerts were scheduled to take place at the beginning of the year, but they were all postponed for the end of the year due to the COVID-19 pandemic.

Track listing 
The band switched to English the name of the tracks with the original name in Japanese (not necessarily the translation) only for overseas digital releases. The album booklet came with the lyrics in Japanese, but most of the songs are sung in English.

Personnel 
 Sho - Vocal
 Retsu - Guitar
 Hiroshi - Drums

References 

Dimlim albums
Japanese-language albums
2020 albums